Abu al-Thana' Mahmud b. Zayd al-Lamishi was a Hanafi-Maturidi scholar from Transoxiana, who was alive in the late 5th and early 6th Islamic centuries.

Biography 
Very little is known about his life. Despite the value of his books, is not known for his publications and the books of tabaqat do not give much detail regarding his life. He was from a place called Lamish in Fergana (Uzbekistan), and was known as Shaykh al-Islam.

Birth 
His date of birth is unknown, but it was reported that he was alive in 539 AH.

Teachers 

It is sometimes assumed that he was a student of Imam Abu al-Mu'in al-Nasafi, though this is not known for sure. He has quoted some sayings from Tabsirat al-Adilla by Abu al-Mu'in al-Nasafi (d. 508/1115).

Books 
His published books include:
 Kitab al-Tamhid li-Qawa'id al-Tawhid, is considered one of the most important books of the Maturidi theology.
 Kitab fi Usul al-Fiqh, is unique amongst works of the usul al-fiqh genre of literature. Unlike other texts, it is arranged more like a glossary and less in accordance with the classic scheme of subject-division in usul books.

Death 
His date of death is uncertain, but some reported that he died at the age of 81 during the month of Ramadan 522 A.H. (1128 A.C.). But this is unlikely, because he was alive in 539 AH. Another, more likely, date for his death is given as in the early sixth century A.H./twelfth century C.E., which would make more sense.

See also 
 List of Hanafis
 List of Ash'aris and Maturidis
 List of Muslim theologians

References

Arabic sources 
 كتاب: التمهيد لقواعد التوحيد لأبي المعين النسفي؛ ويليه: (التمهيد لقواعد التوحيد لأبي الثناء اللامشي)، تحقيق وتعليق: أحمد فريد المزيدي، الناشر: دار الكتب العلمية، ص: 9
 كتاب: جامع المضمرات في شرح مختصر الإمام القدوري، تأليف: يوسف بن عمر بن يوسف الكادوري، دراسة وتحقيق: عمر عبد الرزاق حمد الفياض، الناشر: دار الكتب العلمية، الجزء الثاني، ص: 80

External links 
 A quotation from the book al-Tamhid li-Qawa'id al-Tawhid 

Hanafis
Maturidis
12th-century Muslim theologians
Shaykh al-Islāms
Sunni imams
Sunni fiqh scholars
Sunni Muslim scholars of Islam
Uzbekistani Sunni Muslims
People from Fergana
Date of birth unknown
Date of death unknown